Bryllupet (English: The Wedding) is a 2000 Norwegian drama film directed by Leidulv Risan, starring Mads Ousdal and Susan Badrkhan. The film is about the young biochemistry student Tom (Ousdal), who falls in love with his lab partner, the Iraqi Samira (Badrkhan), and the problems caused by cultural conflict. It was a made-for-TV movie, produced by the Norwegian Broadcasting Corporation.

Reception
In a review for Norwegian newspaper Verdens Gang, Jon Selås gave the movie a "die throw" of three and called it "predictable". Liv Jørgensen of Dagbladet gave it four points, applauding the film's "insight and dramatic devices".

References

External links
 
 Bryllupet at Filmweb.no (Norwegian)
 Bryllupet at the Norwegian Film Institute

2000 films
2000 drama films
Norwegian drama films